Daniel Bruce may refer to:
Daniel Bruce (footballer, born 1868) (1868–1931), Scotland international footballer
Daniel Bruce (footballer, born 1996), English footballer
Daniel D. Bruce (1950–1969), U.S. Marine
Daniel Bruce (chef), founder of the Boston Wine Festival
Daniel Bruce (curler) (born 1999), Newfoundland and Labrador curler